"Don't Wanna Try" is a song by R&B singer Frankie J. It was released as a single in April 2003 and reached number 19 on the US Billboard Hot 100.

Track listing
"Don't Wanna Try"
"Ya No Es Igual"
"Don't Wanna Try" (Spanglish Version)

Charts

References

2003 singles
Frankie J songs
Kumbia Kings songs
Song recordings produced by A. B. Quintanilla
Song recordings produced by Cruz Martínez
2003 songs